Stepping may refer to:

 Walking, one of the main gaits of locomotion among legged animals

Computing 
 Stepping level, an aspect of microprocessor version designation
 Stepping (debugging), a method of debugging

Dance 
 Chicago stepping, a type of dance originating in Chicago
 Step dance, generic term for dance styles where the footwork is the most important part of the dance
 Stepping (African-American), a percussive dance in which the participant's entire body is used as an instrument
 Steppin', album by the Pointer Sisters

See also 
 Step (disambiguation)
 Stepping stone (disambiguation)
 Mast Stepping